RealMassive is a commercial real estate marketplace and data provider with over 6 Billion Square Feet of coverage. The company's technology platform and software enable people to discover commercial real estate and access a standardized, up-to-date data set of available listings to analyze and evaluate commercial real estate market performance.

The free-to-list, free-to-search platform enables the industry to lease, sublease or buy commercial real estate across the United States.

RealMassive's data collection process enables the company to develop a comprehensive database of local listings that tracks activity in markets across the United States to monitor and analyze performance on a market-by-market level weekly.

This technology provides the commercial real estate industry with frequent updates and information on listing activity, allowing the community to adapt to market conditions in real-time.

History

RealMassive is a privately held company headquartered in Austin, Texas. It was founded in May 2013 and has received funding from local investors. Investments totaled $4.6 million in October 2014.

Services 

The company's technology platform allows the commercial real estate industry to add and search commercial real estate listings via an online marketplace. The company then provides access to real-time data generated from the marketplace to brokerages, developers, government entities, financial institutions, and others. As of January 1, 2019, the platform included data for over 6.1 billion square feet of space in 34 markets.

RealMassive's Commercial Real Estate Listing Marketplace is free to list and search for properties. Users can create an account for free to add and market their listing to an audience searching for office, land, retail, industrial, multifamily or co-working properties.

References

American real estate websites